The 1967 NBA Expansion Draft was the third expansion draft of the National Basketball Association (NBA). The draft was held on May 1, 1967, so that the newly founded San Diego Rockets and Seattle SuperSonics could acquire players for the upcoming 1967–68 season. Seattle and San Diego had been awarded the expansion teams on December 20, 1966, and January 11, 1967, respectively. The SuperSonics moved to Oklahoma City, in 2008 and are currently known as the Oklahoma City Thunder. In an NBA expansion draft, new NBA teams are allowed to acquire players from the previously established teams in the league. Not all players on a given team are available during an expansion draft, since each team can protect a certain number of players from being selected. The Rockets and the Sonics selected fifteen unprotected players each, while the ten other NBA teams lost three players each.

The Rockets, the 12th franchise in the NBA, were founded by Robert Breitbard. The Rockets name was chosen because it reflects the growth of the space-age industries in the city as well as the city's theme of "a city in motion". Former Cincinnati Royals and Chicago Zephyrs head coach Jack McMahon was named as the franchise's first head coach and general manager. The Rockets' selections included three-time All-Star Johnny Green. Ten players from the expansion draft joined the Rockets for their inaugural season, but only five played more than one season for the team. Don Kojis, who played three seasons with the Rockets, was named to the 1968 All-Star Game, becoming the franchise's first All-Star.

The SuperSonics, the 11th franchise in the NBA, were founded by a group of investors led by Sam Schulman and Eugene Klein. Schulman then served as president of the team and head of operations. He hired former Chicago Bulls assistant coach Al Bianchi to become the franchise's first head coach. The Sonics' selections included six-time All-Star Richie Guerin and one-time All-Star Tom Meschery. Guerin, who was serving as the St. Louis Hawks' player-coach when the Sonics selected him, decided to retire from playing and became a full-time head coach for the Hawks. He never played for the Sonics, even though he later came back from retirement to play with the Hawks. Nine players from the expansion draft joined the Sonics for their inaugural season, but only four played more than one season for the team. Walt Hazzard, who only played one season with the Sonics, was named to the 1968 All-Star Game, becoming the franchise's first All-Star.

Key

Selections

Notes
 Number of years played in the NBA prior to the draft
 Career with the expansion franchise that drafted the player
 Never played a game for the franchise
 Tom Meschery (formerly Tomislav Mescheryakov) was born in Harbin, Manchuria (now part of China) to Russian parents. He moved to the United States at the age of 8 and became a naturalized U.S. citizen.

References
General

Specific

External links
NBA.com
NBA.com: NBA Draft History

Expansion
Houston Rockets lists
Oklahoma City Thunder lists
National Basketball Association expansion draft
National Basketball Association lists
NBA expansion draft